Beluzhino-Koldairov is a rural settlement and archeological site within the village of Ozerki, located in the Ilovlinsky District, in the central part of the Volgograd Oblast.

It is situated in the steppe zone, between the rivers Don, Ilovlya and Volga, within the Don ridge, in the southern part of the Volga Uplands. The area consists primarily of the Don Natural Park, at the intersection of two natural zones (steppe and semidesert). The park combines the diversity and contrast of the natural environment with the rich legacy of the Cossack peoples who inhabited this land since ancient times.

Beluzhino-Koldairov has an archaeological complex that consists of a large Bronze Age burial mound, surrounded by clusters of small mounds, which are funerary structures dating from the middle ages.

References

Archaeological sites in Russia
Bronze Age sites in Europe
Rural localities in Ilovlinsky District